Badoli is a village in Faridabad district of Haryana, India. The village is bordered by the Agra canal in the east, Bhatola in the west, Budhena in the north and NTPC plant in the south.  The main source of income is milk production followed by agriculture, farming and civil services.

References

Faridabad
Villages in Faridabad district